The Creature Wasn't Nice (also known as Naked Space and Spaceship) is a 1983 American comedy film written and directed by Bruce Kimmel. The movie is a parody of Alien. It stars Leslie Nielsen in a role similar to those in the farcical comedies Airplane and Naked Gun. It co-stars Cindy Williams, Gerrit Graham, and Patrick Macnee. It was released on VHS in 1983 under the title Spaceship to emphasize Nielsen's connection to Airplane!, and released on DVD in 1999 under the title Naked Space to play up the connection to Nielsen's Naked Gun movies.

The movie is a low-budget comedy with simple sets and dialogue wrapped around several musical numbers. In one of the scenes, the red slimy one-eyed alien monster performs a lounge-act style musical number called "I Want to Eat Your Face."  Williams performs two musical numbers, one solo and one with Kimmel, who had previously appeared with and directed Williams in 1976 in The First Nudie Musical.  The film was completely re-edited by the producers - that is what was released as Spaceship/Naked Space on home video.  The original version, The Creature Wasn't Nice, was only seen at two public previews.  In 2019, it was announced that both versions of the film would come to home video under its original title.

Cast
 Leslie Nielsen - Captain Jamieson
 Cindy Williams - Annie McHugh
 Bruce Kimmel - John
 Gerrit Graham - Rodzinski
 Patrick Macnee - Dr. Stark
 Ron Kurowski - The Creature
 Paul Brinegar - Clint Eastwood/Dirty Harry
 Broderick Crawford - Voice of Max the Computer (uncredited) (Crawford's voice does not appear in Spaceship/Naked Space - it has been replaced.)

Reception
TV Guide reviewing the Spaceship version gave the film one out of four stars, calling it a "misguided attempt at horror comedy". Cavett Binion, writing for Allmovie, also reviewing the re-cut version called the film "painfully dull [...] [Patrick Macnee's] hammy performance provides one of the film's few real laughs [...] the lovely soft-shoe number "I Want to Eat Your Face" [provided] the film's other real laugh."  Variety, reviewing the original version of the film under its original title at a public sneak preview in Westwood, called it "a likeably silly send-up of outer-space horror pix like 'Alien'".

References

External links

 

1981 films
American comedy horror films
American science fiction comedy films
1980s English-language films
American parody films
Space adventure films
1980s science fiction comedy films
1980s comedy horror films
1980s science fiction horror films
1981 comedy films
1983 comedy films
1983 films
1980s American films